Mount Van der Hoeven is a mountain (1,940 m) at the north side of the head of Boggs Valley, near the center of Helliwell Hills. It was mapped by United States Geological Survey (USGS) from surveys and U.S. Navy air photos, 1960–63, and was named by the Advisory Committee on Antarctic Names (US-ACAN) for Frans G. Van der Hoeven, a seismologist and leader of the United States Antarctic Research Program (USARP)-sponsored Victoria Land Traverse, 1959–60. The 1,530 mile seismic and topographic traverse in Tucker Sno-Cat vehicles took a roughly triangular course, beginning at Hut Point Peninsula, Ross Island, and ascending to the plateau of Victoria Land via Skelton Glacier.

Mountains of Victoria Land
Pennell Coast